The Indiana–Kentucky football rivalry is an American college football rivalry between the Indiana Hoosiers and Kentucky Wildcats. The Hoosiers played the Wildcats first met in 1893 in Lexington and both tied the game at 24. They played annually in football from 1987 until 2005 in what was known as the "Bourbon Barrel" game as C. M. Newton wanted something similar to the Kentucky–Tennessee rivalry, beer barrel.

Bourbon Barrel
The two teams played for a trophy called the "Bourbon Barrel" from 1987 until both schools mutually agreed to retire the trophy in 1999 following the alcohol-related death of a Kentucky football player. Indiana leads the series (18–17–1).

Game results

See also  
 Indiana–Kentucky rivalry
 List of NCAA college football rivalry games

References

College football rivalries in the United States
Indiana Hoosiers football
Kentucky Wildcats football